Ștefan Grasu is a Romanian professional basketball player.

Early life
Ștefan was born to Nicoleta and Costel Grasu, both discus throwers for Romania at the Summer Olympics. 

He went to school in Vatra Luminoasă (Northeast Bucharest).

When he was 9 years old, he was already a champion in his age group in discus throw. Yet, soon thereafter he started basketball.

Club career
At age 12, he scored 75 points in a youth game, an unmatched record in Romanian basketball.

As a youth player he was with CS Dinamo București. 
In 2019, he signed with CS Universitatea Cluj-Napoca.

In April 2022, Grasu played at the national U-20 tournament in the BTarena. He played alongside Toma Lungoci, Luca Colceag, David Lăpuște and Alexandu Pașca who all have capped for Cluj’s senior team.
U-BT Cluj-Napoca became the tournament champion after beating CS Dinamo București 88-76 in the final. 
Ștefan Grasu was named MVP of the final match where he scored 31 points and recorded 15 rebounds.

National team
Stefan Grasu played for Romania's under-16 national team on several occasions.

Player profile
Ever since his childhood, Grasu was noticed not only for his immense size and wingspan but also for his shooting, dribbling and ball-handling ability.

References

External links
Eurobasket.com Profile
FIBA.com profile
Scout Basketball GM Profile

2003 births
Living people
Basketball players from Bucharest
Centers (basketball)
CS Universitatea Cluj-Napoca (men's basketball) players
Power forwards (basketball)
Romanian men's basketball players